Nakodar Junction (station code: NRO) is located in Jalandhar district in the Indian state of Punjab and serves Nakodar town and nearby villages. Nakodar Town is the administrative headquarter of Nakodar subdivision under Jalandhar district. Nakodar station falls under Firozpur railway division of Northern Railway zone of Indian Railways.

Overview 
This station is located on the single track,  broad gauge, Lohian Khas–Nakodar–Phillaur line and single track BG Jalandhar City–Nakodar line.

Electrification 
Nakodar railway station is situated on single track DMU Lohian Khas–Phillaur line and single track DMU Jalandhar City–Nakodar line. Presently Nakodar station does not have electrified lines but it was reported in Feb 2018 that the electrification of the single track BG Jalandhar City–Nakodar line and the Lohian Khas–Nakodar–Phillaur line was in the pipeline. The central union budget for railways had budgeted funds for the same.

Amenities 
Nakodar railway station has 1 booking windows, no enquiry office and basic amenities like drinking water, public toilets, waiting hall, sheltered area with adequate seating etc. The station had small footfall of 1185 persons per day in 2018. Wheelchair availability is there for disabled persons. There are two platforms at the station.

See also
 List of railway stations in Punjab

References

External links 

 Pictures of Nakodar Junction railway station

Railway stations in Jalandhar district
Firozpur railway division